Viktor Borisovich Alexandrov (born December 28, 1985) is a Kazakhstani former professional ice hockey player. He last played with Admiral Vladivostok in the Kontinental Hockey League (KHL). Alexandrov was drafted 83rd overall by the St. Louis Blues in the 2004 NHL Entry Draft, but he never signed a contract and remained in Russia.

Playing career
At the age of 15, Alexandrov became the youngest player to score in the World Junior Ice Hockey Championship. He signed with Metallurg Novokuznetsk in the Russian Superleague. He then moved to SKA Saint Petersburg in 2005, following Metallurg's former head coach. However, there he struggled to make a difference and prove himself and left to join HC MVD. He then returned to Metallurg and enjoyed a career high 2007–08 season where he scored 20 goals and 43 points in 55 games. Alexandrov signed with Avangard Omsk for the inaugural KHL season in 2008–09.

Personal
He is the son of Soviet hockey star Boris Alexandrov who played for the Team USSR.

Career statistics

Regular season and playoffs

International

References

External links

1985 births
Living people
Admiral Vladivostok players
Amur Khabarovsk players
Avangard Omsk players
Barys Nur-Sultan players
Expatriate ice hockey players in Russia
Metallurg Novokuznetsk players
HC MVD players
HC Sibir Novosibirsk players
Kazakhstani ice hockey right wingers
Kazakhstani people of Russian descent
Kazzinc-Torpedo players
Lokomotiv Yaroslavl players
People from Aktobe
SKA Saint Petersburg players
St. Louis Blues draft picks
Torpedo Nizhny Novgorod players
Traktor Chelyabinsk players